This is a list of the campaigns and military conflicts of the Japanese during the Second Sino-Japanese War. It is not comprehensive.

Prior operations and events

Shantung Incident (1927–1928)
Mukden Incident (September 18, 1931)
Harbin Incident (January, 1932)
First Battle of Shanghai (January 28, 1932)
Signing of the Wusung-Shanghai accord (March 4, 1932)
First battle of Hopei (Operation Nekka) (March, 1933)
First actions in Chahar (1933)
Actions in Interior Mongolia (1935)
Suiyuan Campaign (1936)

Japanese combats in the China campaign proper (1937-45) 

Lukouchiao bridge incident = Marco Polo Bridge Incident July 1937
Second battle of Hopei July 1937
Tientsin Incident July 1937
Operation Chahar August 1937
Battle of Wusung-Shanghai, Second battle of Shanghai August 1937
Battle of Nanking December 1937
Crossing of Yangtze and Hwai
Battle of Linchi
Battle of Taierzhuang
Battle of Hofei
Battle of Tingyuan
Crossing of Hwai river
The Imperial Japanese Army Air Force carried out the first transoceanic air raid in history, with bombers taking off from Taiwan and Japan flying over the China Sea to the Chinese mainland, in 1937.
The Chinese retaliated with the Taihoku Air Strike in (Formosa) during January 1938 when some Chinese bombers struck the city. These are the first hostile air attacks to Japanese soil during the Pacific War before the Doolittle Raid.

Japanese control of Tientsin-Pukow rail lines 

Battle of Hsuchow (May - June 1938)
Battle of Langfeng
Battle of Lowang
Battle of Kueiteh

Crossing of Yangtze river 

Battle of Wuhan (June–November 1938)
Battle of Matang
Battle of Huoko
Battle of Chuichiang
Chinese Strategic retreat to West areas.

Japanese front lines of Paotou, Fenglingtu, Kaifeng, Hsinyang, Yuehyang, and Hangchow  
Since the beginning of the conflict, Japanese Air forces maintained aerial superiority. However, this was weakened by the "Flying Tigers" of Claire Chennault during 1941, and direct aid in 1942 of the USAAF joining Chinese Air forces.
The Japanese reinforced Manchukuo and Chosen with 14 divisions and 2 air fleets to prevent any Soviet attacks. They also established 7 divisions as reserves in Taiwan and Japan for defensive purposes.
The United States announced the Strategic prime materials embargo against Japan (July 1, 1938).
First Japanese offensive attempt in Changkufeng Incident against Soviets (July 1938)
Japan sent additional mobile forces to the Wuhan area for attacking weak Chinese groups in limited offensives.
The Japanese Bacteriological air attack by Units 731 and 1644 launched contaminated, plague-ridden food and clothing against Kaimingyie, the port town of Ningpo during 1938.
Japan commenced the strategic bombing campaign against Szechwan and Chungking (1938).
Japan communized the blocked of Chinese ports in coastal areas.
Battle of Nanchang (March 1939)
Battle of Xiushui River 
Battle of Suixian-Zaoyang
Nomonhan Incident against Russians and Mongols (May - Sept. 1939)
Treaty of Nomanhan (signing for Russians and Japanese), (September 15, 1939)
First Battle of Changsha (September 13, 1939)
Retreat of North Hunan
Chinese winter operations (November 1939–January 1940)

Establishment of the Wang Chingwei regime in Nanking (March 1940)

Battle of Chungyang (battle of South Shansi)
Battle of Chungtiao Shan
Second Battle of Changsha (August–September 1941)
Chinese guerrilla offensives (December 8, 1941)
Chinese offensive against Canton
The first Chinese operations in Burma, Kwangtung (Canton) and Kwangsi.
Crossing of Hsingchiang river
Crossing of Laotao and Liuyang rivers
Third Battle of Changsha

The first Chinese operations in Burma in support of the Allies

Battle of Toungoo
Battle of West Yehta
Battle of Yenangyaung
Chinese retreat to Yunnan
Japanese advance to Yunnan-Burma Road
Operations in West Yunnan
Battle of Tengchung
Battle of Lungling
Falling of Burma (June 1942)
Battle of Chekiang-Kiangsi (April 1942)
Second Japanese Bacteriological air strike by the same unit. They launched bombs in ceramic containers filled with the liquid form of pathogenic agents in the same area mentioned above during 1942.
The Japanese planned the Szechwan Invasion (Spring 1942–Spring 1943).
The Japanese continued their terror air strike campaign against Chungking and Szechwan (1943).
First attempt at putting the plans of the Szechwan invasion to practice
Battle of West Hupei (May 1943)
The Chinese sent troops bound for Yunnan and India.
Battle of Changteh (chemical attacks)
Battle of West Hunan
Battle of West Hupeh (December 1943)
Battle of South Hankow-Peking rail lines (1944)
Chinese communist agents made a secret coordination with Japanese secret agents against Chiang Kai Shek units in Szechwan and Kweichow.
Japanese operations in April 1944
Battle of Central Honan
Battle of Changsha-Hengyang
Battle of Kweilin-Liuchow
American and Chinese Air forces began one sustained bombing campaign against Japanese airfields, military installations and government properties in Japanese-held territories in the China mainland. Both air forces used medium (B-25 and others) and heavy bombers (B-24) in these air strikes.
The USAAF launched the first B-29 air attacks against Japanese territory from Chinese Bases in the south area. The first objective was the Yawata iron factories. These campaigns extended to Manchukuo, Formosa, Chosen, Chinese occupied lands and proper Japan during the war, until the B-29s are sent to Marianas to continue these campaigns.

The second phase of Chinese campaign in Burma in support of the Allies

The Japanese bomb Wuhan (June 1942)
Chinese counteroffensives in Burma (October 1943)
Chinese forced crossing of the Salween river
Battle of Maingkwan (March 1944)
Battle of Mogaung
Siege of Myitkyina
Chinese Offensives in Yunnan
Battle of Lungling
Battle of Tengchung
Battle of Wangting
Other Chinese actions in Burma (1943)
Crossing of the "Stilwell Road" in North Burma
Battle of Mongyu
Battle of Lashio
Battle of Hsipai
British-Chinese meet in Kyaukme
Battle in Henan-Hunan-Guangxi, China (Operation Ichi-Go, April–December 1944)

Final Japanese counteroffensive operations of the China campaign

New Japanese counteroffensives (spring 1945)
Battle of West Honan
Battle of North Hupei
Battle of West Hunan
Japanese retreat from Hsihsiako (west Hunan)
Japanese defeat in Laohoko (west Hupei)
Japanese defeat in Hsue feng Shan (west Hunan)
Battle of Ninhsiang
Battle of Yiyang
Battle of Wuyang
Last Japanese counteroffensives (June–July 1945)
Battle of Nanning
Battle Liuchow
Battle of Kweilin
Japanese defeat in Liuchow-Kweilin
Japanese defeat in Kwangsi

Final Chinese-Allied counteroffensives against Japanese forces

Chinese counteroffensives (July–August 1945)
Planned Chinese operation against Canton, Kwangtung and Kwangsi
Allied and Chinese plans for performing massive counteroffensives in the South China area
Soviet attacks against Kwantung, Manchukuo, Chosen and Japanese northern territories in Karafuto and Chisima.
 Soviet invasion of Manchuria (August 1945)

Imperial Japanese Army surrenders

 The Allies received the surrender text instrument of Japan for media of Switzerland and Sweden (August 8, 1945).
 Eight Japanese emissaries, with Takeo Imai as chief, arrived at Chihciang to meet with Hsiao Yi-su, representative of Chinese commander Ho Ying-chin.
 Japan surrendered officially to Chinese forces in Nanking (September 9, 1945); between 1,283,340 and 2,129,826 units were on Chinese territory.
 From September 11 – October 1945, all Japanese forces met and disarmed, but due to Communist interference, this process did not conclude until February 1946. From October 1945 – June 1946, all the Japanese who remained in China were repatriated with the aid of the US Navy.

Sources
 Hsu Long-hsuen and Chang Ming-kai, History of The Sino-Japanese War (1937-1945) 2nd Ed., 1971. Translated by Wen Ha-hsiung, Chung Wu Publishing; 33, 140th Lane, Tung-hwa Street, Taipei, Taiwan Republic of China. Pg. 180- 184 and Map 3
 Jowett, Phillip S., Rays of The Rising Sun, Armed Forces of Japan’s Asian Allies 1931-45, Volume I: China & Manchuria, 2004. Helion & Co. Ltd., 26 Willow Rd., Solihull, West Midlands, England.
 中国抗日战争正面战场作战记 (China's Anti-Japanese War Combat Operations) 
 Author : Guo Rugui, editor-in-chief Huang Yuzhang 
 Press : Jiangsu People's Publishing House 
 Date published : 2005-7-1 
  
 Online at: https://web.archive.org/web/20090116005113/http://www.wehoo.net/book/wlwh/a30012/A0170.htm

Japanese campaigns
Second Sino-Japanese War